A by-election was held for the New South Wales Legislative Assembly electorate of Illawarra on 28 October 1859 because John Hargrave resigned to accept an appointment to the Legislative Council.

Dates

Result

John Hargrave resigned to accept an appointment to the Legislative Council.

See also
Electoral results for the district of Illawarra
List of New South Wales state by-elections

References

1859 elections in Australia
New South Wales state by-elections
1850s in New South Wales